Vietnam participated in the 2007 Southeast Asian Games held in the city of Nakhon Ratchasima, Thailand from December 6, 2007 to December 16, 2007.

Participation details

Vietnam sent a total of 839 competitors and officials to the 2007 SEA Games. 
605 competitors 
234 officials

Out of the 605 competitors,
65 competed in football, competing for 2 gold medals.
40 competed in shooting and archery, competing for 12 gold medals.
25 competed in karatedo competing for 4 gold medals.
14 competed in pencak silat competing for 3 gold medals.
18 competed in judo competing for 12 gold medals.
24 competed in swimming, 6 in swimming events competing for 1 gold medal and 5 in springboard events competing for 1 gold medal, 13 in water polo events.
15 competed in canoeing, competing for 4 gold medals.
15 competed in rowing competing for 1 gold medal.
26 competed in cycling competing for 2 gold medals.
16 competed in taekwondo competing for 3 gold medals.
35 competed in athletics competing for 7 gold medals.
24 competed in fencing competing for 2 gold medals.
15 competed in boxing competing for 1 gold medal.
14 competed in wrestling competing for 4 gold medals.
9 competed in dancesport competing for 2 gold medals.
7 competed in bodybuilding competing for 1 gold medal.
16 competed in weightlifting competing for 2 gold medals.
18 competed in wushu competing for 3 gold medals.
32 competed in sepak takraw competing for 1 gold medal.
10 competed in table tennis.
23 competed in gymnastics competing for 7 gold medals.
17 competed in billiards-snooker.
9 competed in badminton.
32 competed in volleyball.
18 competed in pétanque.
8 competed in tennis.
7 competed in golf.
12 competed in bowling.
Total sport entries: 29/45

Medals

Notes

Southeast Asian Games
2007
Nations at the 2007 Southeast Asian Games
Southeast Asian Games